On the Hill may refer to:

 On the Hill (TV program), a Canadian TV program
 On the Hill (Boydton, Virginia), a historic house in Boydton, Virginia